Obaidullah Jan Kandaharai, or simply known as Obaidullah Jan, was a singer from Kandahar, Afghanistan. He was popular among the Pashtuns in southern Afghanistan and in Quetta, Pakistan.  He brought some new style to traditional Pashto music and was considered a classical singer. He recorded many albums with lyrics written by Sayed Abdul Khaliq Agha, a famous Pashto poet from Kandahar, Afghanistan.

Obaidullah Jan's songs are enjoyed by many of the Pashtun diaspora around the world, especially the Pashtuns from the Kandahar-Quetta region and those living in Karachi, Pakistan.  He was also recognized by other Afghans who understood Pashto language.

Death
During the Soviet-backed Democratic Republic of Afghanistan, Ubaidullah Jan was secretly crossing the Durand Line into Pakistan with two females when he was murdered by a rogue commander of Ismatullah Muslim. It is believed that Ubaidullah Jan was about 32 years old at the time of death, and that the killing was over proceeds relating to his music. He was buried by Ismatullah Muslim's followers at an unknown place, but very likely somewhere in the Spin Boldak District of Kandahar Province.

See also
List of Afghan singers
List of Pashto-language singers

References

Further reading

External links
 
 
 
 
 
 
 
Facebook – Obaidullah Jan Kandahari

Pashtun singers
Assassinated people
Pashto-language singers
People from Kandahar
1951 births
1983 deaths
20th-century Afghan male singers